The Moyers Building, at S. Court St. in Booneville, Kentucky, was built in 1888.  It was listed on the National Register of Historic Places in 1982.

It was built by B. G. Moyers, a merchant in Booneville, to serve as a general store.  Its bricks were produced by a brick kiln that operated on the banks of Buck Creek.

Its 1982 NRHP nomination assessed it to be architecturally "the most elaborate structure in Booneville with a population of one hundred twenty-six, and the seat of government of Owsley County."

References

National Register of Historic Places in Owsley County, Kentucky
Commercial buildings completed in 1888
1888 establishments in Kentucky
General stores in the United States
Commercial buildings on the National Register of Historic Places in Kentucky